Events from the year 1587 in Ireland.

Incumbent
Monarch: Elizabeth I

Births
Cahir O'Doherty, last Gaelic Lord of Inishowen (d. 1608)

References

 
Ireland
Years of the 16th century in Ireland